King You may refer to:

King You of Zhou (795–771 BC), last ruler of Western Zhou
King You of Chu (died 228 BC), king of Chu during the Warring States period

See also
Duke You (disambiguation)